The Nebula Award for Best Short Story is a literary award assigned each year by Science Fiction and Fantasy Writers of America (SFWA) for science fiction or fantasy short stories. A work of fiction is defined by the organization as a short story if it is less than 7,500 words; awards are also given out for longer works in the categories of novel, novella, and novelette.  To be eligible for Nebula Award consideration a short story must be published in English in the United States. Works published in English elsewhere in the world are also eligible provided they are released on either a website or in an electronic edition. The Nebula Award for Best Short Story has been awarded annually since 1966. The award has been described as one of "the most important of the American science fiction awards" and "the science-fiction and fantasy equivalent" of the Emmy Awards.

Nebula Award nominees and winners are chosen by members of SFWA, though the authors of the nominees do not need to be a member. Works are nominated each year by members in a period around December 15 through January 31, and the six works that receive the most nominations then form the final ballot, with additional nominees possible in the case of ties. Soon after, members are given a month to vote on the ballot, and the final results are presented at the Nebula Awards ceremony in May. Authors are not permitted to nominate their own works, and ties in the final vote are broken, if possible, by the number of nominations the works received. Beginning with the 2009 awards, the rules were changed to the current format. Prior to then, the eligibility period for nominations was defined as one year after the publication date of the work, which allowed the possibility for works to be nominated in the calendar year after their publication and then reach the final ballot in the calendar year after that. Works were added to a preliminary ballot for the year if they had ten or more nominations, which were then voted on to create a final ballot, to which the SFWA organizing panel was also allowed to add an additional work.

During the 58 nomination years, 235 authors have had works nominated; 44 of these have won, including co-authors. One of these authors, Lisa Tuttle, refused her award, and in 1971 no winner was chosen as "no award" received the highest number of votes. Harlan Ellison won three times out of eight nominations, both the highest number of wins and the highest number of nominations of any author. Ten authors have won twice, with Karen Joy Fowler at seven and Gardner Dozois at six having the next highest nomination count after Ellison. Michael Swanwick has the most nominations for short story without winning at six, and Howard Waldrop and Gene Wolfe are next with five each. No other author has been nominated more than four times.

Winners and nominees
In the following table, the years correspond to the date of the ceremony, rather than when the short story was first published. Each year links to the corresponding "year in literature". Entries with a blue background and an asterisk (*) next to the writer's name have won the award; those with a white background are the other nominees on the shortlist. Entries with a gray background and a plus sign (+) mark a year when "no award" was selected as the winner.

  *   Winners and joint winners
  +   No winner selected

See also
 Hugo Award for Best Short Story

Notes

References

External links
 Nebula Awards official site

Awards established in 1966
1966 establishments in the United States
Short Story
Short story awards